Cameron Awkward-Rich is a poet and academic. He is the author of the full-length poetry collection Sympathetic Little Monster, a finalist for the Lambda Literary Award, and Dispatch, which won the 2018 Lexi Rudnitsky Editor's Choice Award. In addition, he has published the chapbook Transit. Awkward-Rich earned a PhD from Stanford University's program in Modern Thought and Literature and teaches women, gender, and sexuality studies at the University of Massachusetts, Amherst. Awkward-Rich was a Keynote Speaker for the 2020 Thinking Trans/Trans Thinking Conference, organized by the Trans Philosophy Project. He was also a Featured Poet during the 2020 Split This Rock Poetry Festival, a gathering in Washington, DC, organized biennially around social justice themes. He lives in Northampton, Massachusetts.

Publications

Books 
Dispatch: poems. New York: Persea Books, 2019.

Sympathetic Little Monster. Los Angeles: Richocet Editions, 2016.

Subject to Change: Trans Poetry & Conversation (with Joshua Jennifer Espinoza, Christopher Soto, Beyza Ozer, Kay Ulanday Barrett). Little Rock: Sibling Rivalry Press, 2017.

Chapbooks 
Transit. Gardena: Button Poetry, 2017.

Craft Essays 
"Craft Capsule: Revising the Archive."

Interviews 
Gow, Robin. "Trying to Feel A Part of Some Kind of 'We': A Conversation With Cameron Awkward-Rich."

Marshell, Kyla. "The Pen Ten with Cameron Awkward-Rich."

Scholarly Articles 
"The Fiction of Ethnography in Charlotte Perkin Gilman's Herland." Science Fiction Studies, v43 n2 (2016): 331–350.

References

 

American male poets
University of Massachusetts Amherst faculty
Living people
Year of birth missing (living people)
Transgender academics
Transgender writers
21st-century LGBT people